The Bundesvision Song Contest 2013 was the ninth edition of the annual Bundesvision Song Contest musical event. The contest was held on 26 September 2013 at the SAP Arena in Mannheim, Baden-Württemberg, following Xavas's win in the 2012 contest in Berlin with the song "Schau nicht mehr zurück". The contest was hosted by Stefan Raab, Sandra Rieß, and Elton in the green room. 
The contest was produced by Brainpool TV.

The winner of the Bundesvision Song Contest 2013 was Bosse with the song "", representing Lower Saxony. In second place was Johannes Oerding representing Hamburg, and third place to  representing Berlin. Bosse's song was released in August 2013, placing at number 83 on the German single chart; after winning the contest, the song rose to number 25.

Returning artists include Bosse who represented Lower Saxony with Anna Loos in 2011, and Pohlmann who represented North Rhine-Westphalia in 2007.

14 of the 16 states awarded themselves the maximum of 12 points, with Mecklenburg-Vorpommern, and North Rhine-Westphalia awarding themselves 8 points each.

Results

Scoreboard

References

External links
 Official BSC website at tvtotal.de

2013
Bundesvision Song Contest
2013 song contests